The National Constitution Center is a non-profit institution devoted to the Constitution of the United States. On Independence Mall in Philadelphia, Pennsylvania, the center is an interactive museum and a national town hall for constitutional dialogue, hosting government leaders, journalists, scholars, and celebrities for public discussions (including presidential debates). The center offers civic learning resources onsite and online. It does not house the original Constitution, which is stored at the National Archives Building in Washington, D.C.

The groundbreaking ceremony  was held on September 17, 2000, the 213th anniversary of the signing of the Constitution. The center opened on July 4, 2003, joining other historic sites and attractions in what has been called "America's most historic square mile" because of its proximity to Independence Hall and the Liberty Bell.

Background

The center was created by the Constitution Heritage Act. Approved on September 16, 1988, and signed by President Ronald Reagan, the act defined the National Constitution Center as "within or in close proximity to the Independence National Historical Park. The Center shall disseminate information about the United States Constitution on a non-partisan basis in order to increase the awareness and understanding of the Constitution among the American people." The center is at 525 Arch Street, an address chosen because May 25 (5/25) was the date that the Constitutional Convention began in Philadelphia.

The architectural firm of Pei Cobb Freed & Partners designed the center, and Leslie E. Robertson Associates were the structural engineers for the project. Witold Rybczynski of The New York Times wrote, "Quiet but assertive, respectful of its surroundings, considerate of its public, this building is destined to take its place among the nation's leading public monuments."

Ralph Appelbaum Associates designed the center's visitor experience and exhibition hall. The center has  of exhibit space. The center is made of American products, including  of Indiana limestone, 2.6 million pounds of steel, and a half-million cubic feet of concrete. Construction of the center was overseen by project manager Hill International.

Prior to its closure in December 2019, the Newseum, a journalism-themed museum in Washington D.C., had featured a four-story-tall stone panel inscribed with the text of the First Amendment as part of its exterior design. The Freedom Forum, a nonprofit organization that created the museum, announced in March 2021 that the panel would be dismantled and donated to the National Constitution Center for display in its second-floor atrium.

Leadership
The National Constitution Center board of trustees appointed law professor, legal commentator, and former visiting scholar Jeffrey Rosen to serve as president and chief executive officer of the center; Rosen began his tenure in June 2013. The chairmen of the board of the Center have been:

Civic education
Originally through its Annenberg Center for Education and Outreach, the center offers onsite and online civic-education programs and a study center which develops and distributes teaching tools, lesson plans and resources.

Public engagement
The center has hosted several debates, including a 2008 Democratic presidential primary debate between Hillary Clinton and Barack Obama, a town hall meeting with Senator John McCain, and a 2006 Pennsylvania Senatorial debate between Republican incumbent Rick Santorum and Democratic challenger Bob Casey.

Liberty Medal
In 2006 the center became home to the Philadelphia Liberty Medal, an annual award established in 1988 to recognize "men and women of courage and conviction who strive to secure the blessings of liberty to people around the globe."

Reception
George Will wrote for The Washington Post, "At the other end of the mall sparkles a modernist jewel of America's civic life, the National Constitution Center". Jason DeParle wrote for The New York Times Learning Network, "Since opening in 2003, [the National Constitution Center] has put forward a vision of constitutional history both left and right have embraced." According to The Philadelphia Inquirer, "The National Constitution Center has established itself as one of the city's cultural celebs, attracting a million visitors a year, putting pizzazz into civic and educational offerings, hosting blockbuster exhibitions, and attracting the nation's intellectual cognoscenti and media elite like bears to honey."

Gallery

See also

 Philadelphia Liberty Medal – An annual award administered by the Center
 Constitution Day (United States)
 Independence National Historical Park
 Founding Fathers of the United States
 Landmark Cases: Historic Supreme Court Decisions, 2015 TV series

References

External links

 
 Peter Jennings Project for Journalists and the Constitution
 Podcast interview with Eli Lesser – Director of Education for the National Constitution Center from the Speaking of History podcast, July 2007
 Constitution Daily blog of the National Constitution Center

Buildings and structures in Independence National Historical Park
History museums in Pennsylvania
Independence National Historical Park
Museums established in 2004
Museums in Philadelphia
Old City, Philadelphia
Constitution of the United States
2004 establishments in Pennsylvania